The George Lewis Seaton House, located at 404 South Royal Street in Alexandria, Virginia and listed in the National Register of Historic Places, is the former home of George Lewis Seaton, a nineteenth-century African-American civic and political leader.

History
George Lewis Seaton was the first African-American legislator from Alexandria elected to the Virginia General Assembly.  He was a wealthy man who tried to forge peace and understanding between the whites and blacks of his area.  Seaton built several important buildings in Alexandria, including Odd Fellows Hall, the Seaton School for Boys, and the Hallowell School for Girls.  He also helped found the Free School Society of Alexandria, the Colored YMCA, and the Colored Building Association.  The two-story, three bay, side hall plan brick townhouse that stands on the property today was built by Seaton's family after he died in 1881.  They lived there into the 20th century, doing several renovations.

References

External links
George L. Seaton House- Virginia African Heritage Program
Historic Places in the City of Alexandria

Houses on the National Register of Historic Places in Virginia
Houses in Alexandria, Virginia
National Register of Historic Places in Alexandria, Virginia